Graham Raymond Bassett (born 6 October 1964) is an English former professional footballer who played as a striker. He was born in Sunderland, Tyne and Wear.

Career
Bassett started his career in the youth team at his hometown club Sunderland. In 1982 Graham spent the 2nd year of his YTS at Ipswich Town scoring 13 goals in 11 youth team games before being released at the end of the season(Source www.prideofanglia.co.uk). He left in 1983 to join Football League Fourth Division side Hartlepool United. He made seven league appearances for the club before transferring to Scottish Football League Second Division outfit Berwick Rangers midway through the season. Bassett scored three times in six league matches, but left the club at the end of the 1983–84 campaign. He then moved into non-league football with Sporting Club Vaux.

References

External links

1964 births
Living people
Footballers from Sunderland
English footballers
Hartlepool United F.C. players
Berwick Rangers F.C. players
English Football League players
Scottish Football League players
Sunderland A.F.C. players
Association football forwards